Astacinga is a municipality in Veracruz, Mexico. It is located about 213 km from state capital Xalapa to the south. It has a surface of 69.09 km2.

The municipality of Astacinga is delimited to the north by Tlaquilpa, to the north-east by Mixtla de Altamirano, to the south-east by Tehuipango and to the west by Puebla, 

It produces maize and beans.

In Astacinga the ecosystems that coexist in the municipality are the one of cold forest with species like the pine.

References

External links 
  Municipal Official Site
  Municipal Official Information

Municipalities of Veracruz